Barbini is an Italian surname. Notable people with the surname include:

Alfredo Barbini (born in 1912), Italian glass artist
Giovanni Barbini (1901–1998), Italian naval officer
Marco Barbini (born 1990), Italian rugby union player
Matteo Barbini (born 1982), Italian rugby player
Matteo Barbini (born 1991), Italian professional footballer
William (Bill) Barbini (born 1947), American violinist

Italian-language surnames